
Gmina Goleniów is an urban-rural gmina (administrative district) in Goleniów County, West Pomeranian Voivodeship, in north-western Poland.

Villages
Apart from the town of Goleniów, Gmina Goleniów contains the villages and settlements of Bącznik, Białuń, Bolechowo, Bolesławice, Borzysławiec, Budno, Burowo, Bystra, Czarna Łąka, Danowo, Dobroszyn, Domastryjewo, Glewice, Gniazdowo, Grabina, Imno, Ininka, Inoujście, Iwno, Kamieniska, Kąty, Kępy Lubczyńskie, Kliniska Wielkie, Komarowo, Krępsko, Krzewno, Łaniewo, Łęsko, Łozienica, Lubczyna, Marszewo, Miękowo, Modrzewie, Mosty, Mosty-Osiedle, Nadrzecze, Niedamierz, Niewiadowo, Podańsko, Pucice, Pucie, Pucko, Rurka, Rurzyca, Smolniki, Stawno, Święta, Tarnowiec, Tarnówko, Twarogi, Wierzchosław, Zaborze, Zabród, Załom, Zamęcie, Żdżary, Żółwia and Żółwia Błoć.

Neighbouring gminas
Gmina Goleniów is bordered by the city of Szczecin and by the gminas of Kobylanka, Maszewo, Osina, Police, Przybiernów, Stargard and Stepnica.

References
Polish official population figures 2006

Goleniow
Goleniów County